Charles Lynch (August 8, 1783February 9, 1853) was a Democratic and Whig politician who served as Governor of Mississippi and was a former enslaver.

Biography
Charles Lynch was born in 1783 in what is now Shelby County, Kentucky (then a part of Jefferson County, Virginia – Kentucky would be formed from Virginia and admitted as a state in its own right in 1792). He was educated in Kentucky, became a farmer, and lived in Sumter, South Carolina before moving to Monticello, Mississippi. According to the 1820 US Federal Census, Lynch also enslaved seven people. Originally a Democrat, he was appointed Lawrence County probate judge in 1821. He was elected to the Mississippi State Senate and served in 1827. In 1831 he was an unsuccessful candidate for governor; in 1832, he was a delegate to the state constitutional convention.

Lynch returned to the Mississippi Senate in 1832. He was elected President of the Senate, and in June 1833, he succeeded Governor Abram L. Scott, who had died in office. He completed Scott's term, serving until November 1833, when he was succeeded by Hiram Runnels.

In 1835 Lynch, now a Whig, ran successfully for governor. He took office in January 1836 and served a two-year term. Mississippi became involved in central banking by chartering the Union Bank during his tenure. In addition, ten new counties were formed. The Panic of 1837 harmed Mississippi's economy, and Lynch did not run for reelection.

After his term expired in January 1838, Lynch remained active in government as the state's Commissioner of Public Buildings. He was also the president of the Alabama and Mississippi Railroad and Bank.

He died on February 9, 1853, and was buried at Greenwood Cemetery in Jackson, Mississippi.

External links
Charles Lynch at National Governors Association
Charles Lynch at The Political Graveyard
 Charles Lynch at 1820 US Federal Census

1783 births
1853 deaths
Governors of Mississippi
Mississippi state senators
Mississippi state court judges
Mississippi Democrats
Mississippi National Republicans
Mississippi Whigs
People from Shelby County, Kentucky
People from Monticello, Mississippi
Whig Party state governors of the United States
19th-century American politicians
19th-century American judges